Marcelo Ríos and Sjeng Schalken were the defending champions but they competed with different partners that year, Ríos with Jordi Burillo and Schalken with John-Laffnie de Jager.

de Jager and Schalken lost in the first round to Brett Hansen-Dent and T.J. Middleton.

Burillo and Ríos lost in the quarterfinals to David Rikl and Pavel Vízner.

Donald Johnson and Francisco Montana won in the final 6–4, 3–6, 6–2 against Rikard Bergh and Jack Waite.

Seeds
Champion seeds are indicated in bold text while text in italics indicates the round in which those seeds were eliminated.

  Libor Pimek /  Byron Talbot (first round)
  David Rikl /  Pavel Vízner (semifinals)
  David Adams /  Menno Oosting (first round)
  Donald Johnson /  Francisco Montana (champions)

Draw

External links
 1996 Grolsch Open Doubles draw

Dutch Open (tennis)
1996 ATP Tour